The Scuderia Toro Rosso STR14 is a Formula One racing car designed and constructed by Scuderia Toro Rosso to compete in the 2019 FIA Formula One World Championship.  The car made its debut at the 2019 Australian Grand Prix. 

The car was initially driven by Daniil Kvyat, and F1 debutant Alexander Albon. In August 2019, in between the Hungarian and Belgian Grands Prix, it was announced that Albon would be promoted to Red Bull Racing for the remainder of the season, while Pierre Gasly would return to Toro Rosso, due to the poor performance of the Frenchman at the senior team Red Bull Racing.

The car is the second Toro Rosso car to be powered by a Honda engine, and is the first Toro Rosso car to score a podium finish since the Toro Rosso STR3 of 2008, with two podium finishes, scored by Daniil Kvyat in Germany, and Pierre Gasly in Brazil. The STR14 ended the 2019 season in 6th place in the constructor standings with 85 points, achieving their highest championship position since finishing 6th in 2008, and while also scoring the highest number of points in a single season in the team's history. Owing to the team's rebranding to Scuderia AlphaTauri after the 2019 season, the STR14 was the last car produced by the Faenza-based team to bear the Toro Rosso name.

Design and development 
The car was launched online, on 11 February 2019. This was the last car to be designed by the outgoing Technical Director of the team, James Key, ahead of his departure to McLaren. The car features a number of shared components with the Red Bull RB15, with the full rear end, including the rear suspension, as well as a number of front suspension components coming from the senior team's car.  It had its shakedown completed at the Misano World Circuit Marco Simoncelli, with Daniil Kvyat, and Alexander Albon at the wheel, ahead of pre-season testing, on 13 February 2019.

The online launch specifications appeared to be for a greatly simplified version of the previous year's car, most notably at its front. However, significant changes were observed throughout the remainder of the car. The nose appeared to be the 2018 specification carried from its predecessor due to several cues, such as the thumb tip, louvered mounting pylons and the S-Duct. The monocoque of the car saw the sloped front section become more pronounced, due to the added hump formed over the front suspension rockers, similar to that on the Force India VJM11. The wishbones of the front suspension were lowered compared to the Toro Rosso chassis used for the previous two seasons; previously they had been raised due to aerodynamic reasons. Compared to the rest of the car, the sidepods saw the most number of changes, with the team switching from a conventional sidepod design to a new high-top design that had first been seen on the Ferrari SF70H, before appearing on a number of other cars on the grid.

Competition history 
The car has proven to be more competitive compared to its predecessor, with the car showing much one-lap pace, in Qualifying on Saturday, with the drivers reaching Q3 regularly. The car would receive its first engine upgrade of the year at the power demanding Baku City Circuit, where the Azerbaijan Grand Prix was held, with the upgrade focusing on improving the reliability, as well as power improvements. The team would score its first double points finish for the car at the 2019 Monaco Grand Prix, with Kvyat in P7 and Albon in P8. At the chaotic 2019 German Grand Prix, Daniil Kvyat scored a shock podium for the team, in what was the team's first podium finish since 2008, when Sebastian Vettel won the 2008 Italian Grand Prix. Later in 2019, Pierre Gasly finished second at the Brazilian Grand Prix by 0.062 seconds ahead of Mercedes driver Lewis Hamilton taking the team's third podium, its second of the year, and also his maiden podium finish. This would prove to be the team's most successful season yet, scoring more points than in any other season previously.

Complete Formula One results
(key)

 Driver failed to finish the race, but was classified as they had completed over 90% of the winner's race distance.

References

External links

Toro Rosso Formula One cars
2019 Formula One season cars